Blood for Blood is the fourth studio album from American groove metal band Hellyeah. Produced by Kevin Churko, the album was released on June 10, 2014, through Eleven Seven Music. Producer Kevin Churko handled the bass duties in the studio due to the departure of Bob Zilla. Vocalist Chad Gray has stated he believes this album to be the band's strongest release.

Track listing

Personnel
Chad Gray – vocals
Tom Maxwell – guitars
Kevin Churko – bass
Vinnie Paul – drums

Charts

Singles

Notes

References

External links

2014 albums
Hellyeah albums
Albums produced by Kevin Churko
Eleven Seven Label Group albums